Delta/Greely School District is a school district in Delta Junction, Alaska. The superintendent is Shaun Streyle.
It operates the following schools:

Delta Elementary School
Delta High School
Fort Greely School
New Horizons High School	
Delta/Greely Homeschool
Gerstle River School

References

External links

Education in Unorganized Borough, Alaska
School districts in Alaska
Southeast Fairbanks Census Area, Alaska